Gil de Ferran (born November 11, 1967 in Paris, France) is a French-born Brazilian professional racing driver and team owner. De Ferran was the 2000 and 2001 Champ Car champion driving for Team Penske and the winner of the 2003 Indianapolis 500. He also finished runner-up in the American Le Mans Series LMP1 class in 2012, with his own de Ferran Motorsports.

Early career

Inspired by the success of fellow Brazilian Emerson Fittipaldi, de Ferran began his career in kart racing in the early 1980s. He graduated to Formula Ford level in 1987 and Formula Three in 1991. Driving for Edenbridge Racing, De Ferran finished the 1991 British Formula Three season in third, only behind Rubens Barrichello and David Coulthard.  For the 1992 season, De Ferran moved to Paul Stewart Racing and won the title, scoring seven wins in the process.

1993 and 1994 were spent driving for Paul Stewart Racing in International Formula 3000. De Ferran finished fourth in the series in 1993 and then took the championship down to the wire in 1994, ultimately finishing third.  In 1993, De Ferran tested for a day the Footwork Arrows Formula One team along with Dutch racer Jos Verstappen.  His day was seriously compromised after he bumped his head while walking nearby the motorhome, with de Ferran recalling the incident as follows: "I was walking between two of the trucks, looking down thinking, this is not going so well. And I hit my head on a swing-up locker door on the side of the truck. Split my head open, blood everywhere, game over."  His times also compared poorly to Verstappen's.

IndyCar

At the end of 1994, de Ferran was invited to test a CART IndyCar by Hall/VDS Racing. Despite the worries of the team's sponsor Pennzoil that de Ferran was not a famous enough name for their car, the team was sufficiently impressed to offer de Ferran a drive for 1995. With no top-line Formula One drive available, de Ferran took up the offer to drive in America. De Ferran won the PPG Indy Car World Series Rookie Of The Year award in 1995 by finishing 14th. After dominating the Cleveland CART PPG Indy Car World Series race he would be taken out while trying to lap Scott Pruett. He would score his first win in the last race of the year at Laguna Seca Raceway.

In 1996, de Ferran was a consistent challenger but only scored one win, at Cleveland's Burke Lakefront Airport street circuit, avenging the previous season's heartbreaking loss at the same race. This win was also the last for veteran car owner and driver Jim Hall who retired from the sport at the end of 1996. Hall's retirement also spelled the end of the Jim Hall owned Pennzoil/VDS IndyCar team. Despite rumours that he would be a driver for the new Stewart Grand Prix Formula One team, de Ferran remained in America for 1997, joining Walker Racing. De Ferran finished 1997 as runner-up to Alex Zanardi with ten top-ten finishes but failed to score a single victory. He looked on course to win the season opener at Homestead-Miami Speedway but was knocked out of the lead by Dennis Vitolo, who was a lap down from de Ferran. At the Grand Prix of Portland he lost out to PacWest Racing's Mark Blundell in the closest finish in CART history. The expected championship challenge never materialized in 1998. Unreliability, driver errors and the inferior performance of the Goodyear tires compared to the superior Firestone tires all combined to leave de Ferran 12th in the standings, again with no wins in the year.

In 1999, the long-awaited breakthrough finally came as de Ferran beat Juan Pablo Montoya at Portland International Raceway to take his first win since 1996 and the Walker Racing team's first since early 1995. However that victory would mark the end of an era as both Goodyear and Valvoline both left CART as major sponsors and suppliers at the end of the 1999 season. Toward the end of that season, de Ferran and Greg Moore were signed to Marlboro Team Penske to replace Al Unser Jr. and the rotating arrangement of drivers employed after Andre Ribeiro retired. However, Moore was killed in a crash during the season finale at California Speedway and de Ferran's fellow countryman Hélio Castroneves was announced as the replacement for Moore shortly afterwards.

As of December 2022, this stands as the fastest qualifying lap speed ever recorded at an official race meeting. He would follow the record speed by winning the series championship at Fontana on Monday, October 30. (The season finale started on Sunday, October 29 but was forced to finish on October 30 due to rain).

In 2001, de Ferran did not appear in Sylvester Stallone's film Driven along with his teammate Hélio Castroneves and his owner Roger Penske for unknown reasons.

The Penske years saw de Ferran finally fulfill the promise of the earlier part of his career with two CART titles and an Indy 500 victory. His analytical approach earned him comparisons with Penske's first driver, Mark Donohue. He also garnered praise for his politeness and integrity: when Penske switched to the Indy Racing League in 2002, he did not criticize the move even though it meant he could not defend his CART title. In 2003, de Ferran was injured during a race at Phoenix, suffering a broken back. Despite the injury, de Ferran passed his teammate, Castroneves with 31 laps left to win an emotional victory at the 2003 Indianapolis 500. It also was the second 1–2 finish for Penske Racing in the Indianapolis 500.

Following his Indianapolis triumph de Ferran decided to retire at the end of 2003. He won his final race at Texas Motor Speedway, although the moment was soured by a terrifying crash during the race that left fellow Indy 500 winner and Rahal-Letterman Racing driver Kenny Bräck seriously injured.

Formula One managerial career

In 2005, he moved to the BAR-Honda Formula One team as their Sports Director. He resigned from this position in July 2007 after becoming "increasingly uncomfortable" with the team.

In July 2018 de Ferran was made sporting director for McLaren following Eric Boullier's resignation. He left the team in early 2021.

de Ferran Motorsports

On January 29, 2008 de Ferran announced that he would return to the cockpit and field a factory-backed LMP2 class Acura ARX-01b prototype in the American Le Mans Series, under the team name de Ferran Motorsports. The team began competing around the mid-way point of the 2008 season, with De Ferran running the team and sharing driving duties with Simon Pagenaud.

Success again was immediate and de Ferran Motorsports took four front row grid positions, led six races and scored three podium finishes in just eight starts.

2009 saw another challenge when de Ferran Motorsports was chosen by Honda to develop the Acura ARX-02a for competition in the LMP1 division of the American Le Mans Series.  The team scored five outright wins, seven poles, seven fastest laps and finished runners up in the ALMS LMP1 class.

Return to IndyCar

Half way through 2009 de Ferran announced his decision to retire from the cockpit at the end of the racing season, expressing his intention to concentrate all his resources on expanding his team, making public his desire to return to IndyCar racing as a front running team owner.  Prior to the start of the 2010 IZOD IndyCar season, de Ferran merged his team with Luczo Dragon Racing, a team started by Jay Penske, the son of de Ferran's former boss Roger Penske, and Steve Luczo, a successful technology leader and racing enthusiast.  The new team was named de Ferran Dragon Racing and is the realization of de Ferran's ambition to return to IndyCar.

De Ferran Dragon Racing, with driver Raphael Matos, earned four Top Ten finishes in its debut campaign and led 15 laps during the season finale at Homestead-Miami Speedway.

In 2010, IndyCar also began planning for a completely new car concept, to debut during the 2012 season.  Due to his technical knowledge, motorsports experience across different series and roles, as well as the widespread respect he holds within the racing industry, de Ferran was chosen by his team owner peers to represent their interests in the development of the future IndyCar.  As part of the ICONIC committee, who created the concept for the future of IndyCar Racing.

In 2011 de Ferran Dragon racing closed its doors due to lack of funding, having attempted to stay operational for the new season.

Recognition

In July 2013, Autosport magazine named De Ferran one of the 50 greatest drivers to have never raced in Formula One.

Personal life

De Ferran currently lives in Fort Lauderdale, Florida with his English wife Angela (who worked for Paul Stewart Racing) and children.

Motorsports career results

Complete British Formula Three results
(key) (Races in bold indicate pole position) (Races in italics indicate fastest lap)

Complete International Formula 3000 results
(key) (Races in bold indicate pole position) (Races in italics indicate fastest lap)

Complete American Open Wheel Racing results
(key)

CART

IndyCar Series

Indianapolis 500 results

CART career results

Indy Racing League career results

Complete American Le Mans Series results

References

External links

1967 births
Living people
American Le Mans Series drivers
Brazilian expatriate sportspeople in the United States
Brazilian people of French descent
Brazilian racing drivers
Brazilian IndyCar Series drivers
British Formula Three Championship drivers
Brazilian Champ Car drivers
Champ Car champions
Champ Car drivers
EFDA Nations Cup drivers
Formula One people
Indianapolis 500 drivers
Indianapolis 500 winners
IndyCar Series drivers
IndyCar Series team owners
International Formula 3000 drivers
McLaren people
Supercars Championship drivers
Team Penske drivers
De Ferran Motorsports drivers
Sports car racing team owners
Paul Stewart Racing drivers
Walker Racing drivers